Horace Rendall Mansfield (25 December 1863 – 9 February 1914) was a British Liberal Party politician.

Family
He was the second son of Cornelius Mansfield of Stratford, Essex. He married in 1885, Mary Annie Rose of Mansfield. They had three sons and one daughter. She died in 1905. He then married in 1908, Sarah Elizabeth Winterton of Leicester.

Career
He was a manufacturer of clay goods, mainly tiles. He was a Justice of the Peace in Derbyshire. He was Liberal MP for Spalding Division of Lincolnshire from 1900 to 1910. He was elected at the 1900 General Election, gaining the seat from the Liberal Unionist Party by a majority of just 57 votes. He was comfortably re-elected in 1906 before retiring in January 1910.

References
Debretts House of Commons and Judicial Bench - 1901
British Parliamentary Election Results 1885 - 1918, F. W. S. Craig

1863 births
1914 deaths
Liberal Party (UK) MPs for English constituencies
UK MPs 1900–1906
UK MPs 1906–1910
English justices of the peace
Politics of Lincolnshire